The Budhpurnima Express is an superfast express train of East central Railway zone of Indian Railways.It runs between major "Buddhist Hubs" such as Rajgir, Pawapuri, Nalanda, Patna, Gaya, Varanasi/Sarnath cities in Bihar and Uttar Pradesh. It is operated between Rajgir and Varanasi cities of India.

Routing
The trains run from Rajgir to Varanasi Junction via Nalanda, Bihar Sharif Junction, Bakhtiyarpur Junction, Patna Junction, Gaya Junction, Guraru, Jehanabad, Sasaram Junction, Pt. Deen Dayal Upadhyay Junction, Kashi Railway Station and Varanasi Junction.

Accident 
On 30 November 2011, the parcel bogie of Budh Purnima Express caught fire at Rajgir railway station in Bihar's Nalanda district. No casualties were reported, railway officials said. The train was standing at the station when the bogie caught fire, they said, adding that firefighters were pressed into service immediately. The damaged bogie was replaced before the train left for its next journey. The cause of the fire was not known.

See also
 Vibhuti Express
 Doon Express
 North East Express

References

External links
 14224 India Rail Info
 14223 India Rail Info

Passenger trains originating from Varanasi
Transport in Rajgir
Named passenger trains of India
Rail transport in Bihar
Express trains in India